Histioea hoffmannsi is a moth of the subfamily Arctiinae. It was described by Rothschild in 1911. It is found in Brazil (Amazonas).

References

 Natural History Museum Lepidoptera generic names catalog

Arctiinae
Moths described in 1911